Abdul Bari Aboobakur commonly spelled as Abdul Baree (20 March 1967) is a former Maldivian singer.

Career
In 1990, Baaree started performing in the "Aksheeba" shows without any charge, which helped in gaining recognition from music lovers. Afterwards, he expanded his presence to other stage shows including "Fannaanunge Muzikee Eid", "Galaxy" and other shows being performed in Male' and atoll islands. He started his professional career as a singer in 1997 by contributing to the studio albums including Mathaaran. Indian classical touch in his rendition, often compared with Bollywood singer Mohammed Rafi, was particularly noted by the music directors which helped him gain several projects within a short period of time. From the year 2000 to 2011, Bari had been a consistent contributor to the soundtrack album of several films.

In 2005, the Government of Maldives honoured him with the National Award of Recognition, which he attributed as his biggest achievement of his career. During the time, he worked as a mentor to the students performing in the Interschool Singing Competition. In the media, he has been noted as a "bubbly performer who brings a smile to the listener with his joyful rendition, except for the emotional songs". Similarly, his live performances are discussed to be enjoyable with his engaging behavior on the stage.

In 2011, Baaree made a public announcement that after listening to a religious documentary titled Maru, he decided to quit music and regret his involvement in the industry. Afterwards, he only performed religious tracks and advised his followers to avoid listening his music. Despite stepping away from the musical scene for personal reasons, many of his songs remain popular even after decades of its release. In 2018, Baaree was ranked third in the list of the "Most Desired Comeback Voices", compiled by Dho?.

Discography

Feature film

Short films

Television

Non-film songs

Religious / Madhaha

Accolades

References 

Living people
People from Malé
1967 births
Maldivian playback singers